Maurice Izier (Crest, 18 March 1944) was a French professional road bicycle racer. Izier won stage 22A of the 1968 Tour de France.

Major results

1965
Circuit de Lorraine
1966
Circuit d'Auvergne
1967
Sanvignes
1968
Avenches
Tour de France:
Winner stage 22A
1970
Entrains

External links 

Official Tour de France results for Maurice Izier

French male cyclists
1944 births
Living people
French Tour de France stage winners
Sportspeople from Drôme
Cyclists from Auvergne-Rhône-Alpes